Meltham railway station is a railway station in Bayswater, a suburb of Perth, Western Australia. It is on the Midland line and Airport line, between Maylands and Bayswater. It is 5.5 kilometres (2.8 mi), or 10 minutes by train, from Perth railway station Services run every 6 minutes during peak and every 7.5 minutes between peak.

The station was built during the late 1940s, after first being promised in 1898, and after decades of campaigning by residents and the Bayswater Road Board. The station underwent a refurbishment in 2012. Development of higher density buildings around Meltham station has been a contentious issue since the mid 2010s. The Airport line opened on 9 October 2022.

Description
Meltham railway station is in the Perth suburb of Bayswater, Western Australia. It is located between Whatley Crescent to the south, and Railway Parade to the north. Just to the east is the Hotham Street bridge over the railway. To the north is the intersection of Railway Parade and Grand Promenade. The adjacent railway stations are Maylands towards Perth, or Bayswater towards Midland.

The station consists of a single island platform with two platform faces. The track through the station is dual gauge. Transperth services operate on narrow gauge; standard gauge trains do not stop at the station. At the west end of the platform is a pedestrian level crossing for access to the station. At the east end of the platform is a footbridge connected to the platform by a ramp.

History

Early history
A station at this location was first promised in 1898. A signal box at this location was built in 1913.

In 1937, the townsite of Meltham Heights was gazetted, consisting of the area around Hotham Street. Transport for Meltham Heights was an issue. With the area being working class, car ownership was uncommon. Residents and the Bayswater Road Board (now the City of Bayswater) agitated for a railway station.

Bayswater and its surrounding suburbs' population surged following the end of World War II. Housing construction, which was non-existent during the war, proceeded at a rapid rate post-war. Development occurred in Meltham Heights, and construction of the station there finally began in 1947. Shortages of labour and materials prevented the station's completion until 1949, however, with the station partially completed, the eastern  opened in 1948.

Modern day
In 2012, Meltham station was upgraded to comply with accessibility and safety requirements. This included resurfacing the platform, an extension to the car park and public art. The upgrade cost $2 million.

In 2016, the Public Transport Authority said that closing stations with low patronage was a possibility. On a typical weekday, 524 passengers use Meltham station. The Public Transport Authority later said that there were no immediate plans to close the station, in response to fears that Meltham would be closed.

Increased building density is a contentious issue around Meltham. Currently, Meltham is surrounded by 1 to 2-storey buildings. In 2017, City of Bayswater councillors voted against the Meltham precinct structure plan, which would have resulted in six-storey apartments on some roads near the station. However, the Western Australian Planning Commission overruled the council.

In 2019 and 2020, the City of Bayswater proposed that a new suburb named Meltham be created, covering the area around Meltham railway station. The purpose of the suburb was to give the area its own identity, as currently it is overshadowed by the rest of Bayswater. Councillors decided in May 2020 to not proceed with the proposed renaming.

Construction to add 100 bays to the northern carpark at Meltham station started in February 2020. This is due to the 180 bays that were permanently removed at Bayswater station in late 2020 due to the construction of the new Bayswater station. The new car bays opened in October 2020.

Rail services
Meltham railway station is served by the Midland and Airport lines on the Transperth network. The Midland line goes between Midland and Perth and the Airport line goes between High Wycombe and Claremont. It will also be served by the Morley–Ellenbrook line when that opens in late-2024. Services on that line will go between Ellenbrook and Perth. Midland line trains stop at the station every 10 minutes during peak on weekdays, and every 15 minutes during the day outside peak every day of the year except Christmas Day. Trains are half-hourly or hourly at night time. The station saw 169,432 passengers in the 2013-14 financial year.

Bus routes

Gallery

References

Midland line, Perth
Railway stations in Australia opened in 1948
Railway stations in Perth, Western Australia
Bayswater, Western Australia
Airport line, Perth